The 1999–00 season was the 105th season in the history of Plymouth Argyle Football Club, their 75th in the Football League.

Players

First-team squad
Squad at end of season

Left club during season

Third Division

League table

Results by round

Matches

Plymouth Argyle's score comes first

Auto Windscreens Football League Trophy

Matches

Worthington Football League Cup

Matches

FA Cup

Matches

Statistics

Appearances and goals

Last updated: 15 February 2015Source:Greens on Screen
 Source:Football Squads.co.uk

Notes

References

Plymouth Argyle F.C. seasons
Plymouth Argyle